Shaba North was the launch site of the first rockets launched by Orbital Transport und Raketen AktienGesellschaft, or Orbital Forwarding Company in English ("OTRAG").   It is located in the Democratic Republic of Congo.

In 1976 Luvua Airport was built to supply the site.

In 1977 and in 1978 three test flights of OTRAG rockets were launched from Shaba North.

In 1979 OTRAG stopped launching rockets from Shaba North for political reasons. Its launching activities were later moved to Sabha, Libya.

References

External links
 Shaba North at astronautix.com

Rocket launch sites